Damien High School is an all-boys Roman Catholic high school in La Verne, in the U.S. state of California named for Saint Damien of Molokai. The school had its first graduating class in 1963. Each of Damien's freshmen classes draws from an average of over 75 different elementary and junior high schools for youths from Los Angeles and San Bernardino counties. It is located in the  Roman Catholic Archdiocese of Los Angeles. It is a part of the tri-school community including St. Lucy's Priory High School and Pomona Catholic High School.

History

The school opened in 1959 as Pomona Catholic Boys High School and was renamed in 1967 as Damien High School, in honor of St. Damien de Veuster, SS.CC., who was canonized by Pope Benedict XVI on Sunday October 11, 2009. The Sacred Heart Fathers have staffed and administered the school since its beginning in La Verne. The courage and capacity for self-sacrifice in the cause of others, is encouraged as an impetus toward social causes in the lives of Damien's students.

In 1996, a new swimming pool and locker room were constructed. Six new tennis courts were also built near the priests' residence and a new ticket/snack bar/rest room facility was built in Spartan Stadium. A new gymnasium, The Travers Cronin Athletic Center, was opened in 2006. In 2008, the Spartan Stadium was renovated.  It now includes an all weather track and FieldTurf. Spartan Stadium was renamed "Dick Larson Stadium" in honor of the school's longtime football coach. 2010 brought a renovation of the football stadium, including the installation of a new scoreboard and stadium seating. The stadium was officially named "Tom Carroll Stadium," in honor of Damien's Athletic Director of 37 years.

In 2014, Damien and St. Lucy's Priory High School were moved from the Sierra League, where they had competed since 1998, to the Baseline League. The League consists of Damien/St. Lucy's, Chino Hills, Etiwanda, Los Osos, Rancho Cucamonga, and Upland.

In 2015, the basketball team won the California Interscholastic Federation State championship (Division III) by defeating Campolindo High of Moraga (CIF North Coast Section) by the score of 70-57 at Haas Pavilion on the campus of the University of California, Berkeley.

School activities

Policy Debate Team
The Damien Policy Debate team won the 2009 National Debate Coach's Association National Championship, the 2009 National Forensic League National Tournament, and the inaugural Unger Cup, the award given to the "nation's most successful high school debate squad."  Damien qualified 4 teams to the TOC in 2009, more than any other school in the nation. A school team won the National Debate Coaches Association (NDCA) Tournament, in 2011, making Damien the first school to win the NDCA twice.

Student Spaceflight Experiments Program 
Damien High School was one of 23 communities involved with Student Spaceflight Experiment Program (SSEP's) Mission 7 to send a science experiment to the International Space Station. The experiment was originally aboard the SpaceX-7 rocket launched on June 28, 2015 which exploded 2 minutes into launch. The experiment was successfully re-flown on the SpaceX CRS-8 (SpaceX Falcon 9 rocket; Dragon spacecraft) on April 8, 2016, and docked with the International Space Station two days later. The experiment studies the effects of tardigrades in a microgravity environment.

Tri-School Community
Damien High School is a part of the "tri-school" community existing between St. Lucy's Priory High School and Pomona Catholic High School. Numerous dances and functions are coordinated between the three schools during the school year. Additionally, financial incentives exist for parents who have multiple children attending these schools.

Notable alumni
 Buckethead (né Brian Carroll), guitarist, musician, composer
 Chukwudi Chijindu, professional soccer player (Chivas USA)
 Casey Dailey, former NFL football player
 Nick Davila, professional football player (Arizona Rattlers); ArenaBowl XXV Champion
 Rick Davis, retired professional soccer player (New York Cosmos); captain of the 1984 Olympic soccer team
 Bill Duffy, sports agent
 Brian Dunseth, retired professional soccer player; television commentator
 Joe Franchino, retired professional soccer player
 Mike Hunter, retired professional soccer player
 Chris Jakubauskas – Professional baseball player, Toronto Blue Jays
 Ian Johnson, retired professional football player (Miami Dolphins)
 Stephen G. Larson, attorney; former United States Federal judge 
 Cory Lekkerkerker, retired professional football player
 Joe Lunardi, ESPN NCAA Basketball Bracketologist
 Mark McGwire, retired professional baseball player, MLB coach
 Mike Morrell, California state senator
 Daniel Moskos, professional baseball player
 Frank Pastore, retired professional baseball player
 Cody Ponce, professional baseball player
 William Saito, special advisor for the government of Japan in charge of science & technology; entrepreneur
 Dennis Shaw, retired professional football player; 1970 NFL Offensive Rookie of the Year
 Geoff Vanderstock, former world record holder 400 metres hurdles
 Tristan Vizcaino, professional football player
 Larry Wilmore, comedian, writer (The Daily Show)

References

External links

Damien High School Website

Roman Catholic secondary schools in Los Angeles County, California
Boys' schools in California
La Verne, California
Educational institutions established in 1959
Catholic secondary schools in California
1959 establishments in California